Antonio Barrutia Iturriagoitia (13 June 1933 – 13 July 2021) was a Spanish cyclist. Professional from 1953 to 1966, he won the Vuelta a Andalucía in 1963 and seven stages of the Vuelta a España. He rode in eight editions of the Vuelta a España and three editions of the Tour de France.

His brother, Cosme was also a professional cyclist.

Major results

1952
 3rd National Road Race Championships
1953
 1st GP Llodio
 1st Stage 5 Vuelta a Asturias
1954
 1st Circuito de Getxo
 1st GP Llodio
 3rd Prueba Villafranca de Ordizia
 3rd Overall GP Ayutamiento Bilbao
1st Stages 1 & 3
1955
 1st Stage 4B Vuelta a Andalucía
 1st Subida a Arrate
 3rd Circuito de Getxo
1956
 1st Stage 5 Vuelta a Asturias
 1st Subida a Arrate
 3rd Klasika Primavera
 3rd Overall Vuelta a Andalucía
1957
 1st Stage 8 Vuelta a Levante
 1st  Overall Euskal Bizikleta
 2nd Overall Vuelta a La Rioja
1959
 1st Stage 7 Vuelta a España
 3rd Circuito de Getxo
1960
 1st Stage 3 Vuelta a España
1961
 1st Circuito de Getxo
 1st Subida al Naranco
1962
 1st Stage 1 Vuelta a España
 2nd Overall Vuelta a Andalucía
 3rd Klasika Primavera
1963
 1st Prueba Villafranca de Ordizia
 1st Stages 1A & 3 Vuelta a España
 1st  Overall Vuelta a Andalucía
1st Stages 1B & 5
 1st Stage 11 Volta a Catalunya
 3rd Overall Vuelta a La Rioja
1964
 1st Stages 4B & 16 Vuelta a España
 1st  Overall Vuelta a La Rioja
1st Stages 1 & 2
 2nd Overall Vuelta a Levante

References

1933 births
2021 deaths
Spanish male cyclists
Sportspeople from Biscay
Cyclists from the Basque Country (autonomous community)
People from Durangaldea